Hadas (Arabic: حدس), officially the Islamic Constitutional Movement is a Kuwaiti Islamist political organization. The bloc is an offshoot of the Muslim Brotherhood.

History and profile
Hadas was established on 31 March 1991 following the liberation of Kuwait from the Iraqi invasion in the Gulf War. The group of people who started the Movement and still control it are Kuwaiti Islamists following the ideology of the Muslim Brotherhood, most notably is Jassem Mohalhel.

Bader Al-Nashi was secretary general of Hadas between 2003 and July 2009. Its current secretary general is Mohammad al-Olaim. It has three members in the current National Assembly of Kuwait.

National Assembly elections

See also
Hadas Gold (born 1988), American media and business reporter

References

External links
 Hadas Web Site

1991 establishments in Kuwait
Political parties established in 1991
Political parties in Kuwait
Islamic political parties
Islamism in Kuwait
Muslim Brotherhood